Warwick Investment Group is a SEC-registered investment advisor, managing funds that invest globally in natural resources and real estate. Warwick has an established track record in strategic consolidation in these sectors, having completed more than 4,000 transactions since inception. The firm has ~75 team members and advisors in the US and Europe investing across private equity funds, special purpose vehicles and open-ended structures.

Warwick’s energy and natural resources platform specializes in consolidating working interests and royalties using geology, engineering, data science and multi-disciplinary investment teams. Warwick’s real estate platforms specialize in identifying investment opportunities in markets with favorable tailwinds and attractive risk-adjusted returns. Through consolidation strategies and development, the firm generates alpha through stable and growing yields, inflation protection and value-add returns.

Strategy
Warwick specializes in asset classes where it can provide differentiated returns across market cycles. 

Warwick has a large data science practice that specializes in econometrics, natural language processing, machine learning, network graph algorithms, on-chain analytics and multivariate geospatial, predictive, prescriptive and time series analytics.

History
Warwick was founded in 2010 by Kate Richard, a former Goldman Sachs investment banker and investor for MSD Capital, Michael Dell's private investment fund in New York.

Activities
 June 2022: Warwick further consolidated its London Mayfair portfolio with the acquisition of two buildings on Green Street. Warwick received a $50 million commitment to its residential platform from the Michigan Office of Retirement Services.
 March 2022: Warwick added to its portfolio in Belgravia with the addition of its Mozart portfolio.
 December 2021: The residential platform acquired the historic 13 North Audley in Mayfair, London, through an off-market transaction.
 October 2021: Warwick acquired a rare portfolio of nine gated freehold mews houses with underground parking in Belgravia, London.
 September 2021: Warwick Investment Group increased Eagle Ford Shale footprint with $450 million acquisition from Rosewood Resources.
 June 2021: Warwick hired former CPC Group executive to lead its European real estate platform.
 March 2021: Warwick Investment Group announced its Final Close for its fourth energy fund, Warwick Partners IV, L.P.
 August 2015: Warwick announced its first closing and commenced capital deployment for Warwick Partners III, L.P., a discretionary private investment fund.
 May 2015: Warwick Energy Investment Group, LLC, an affiliate of Warwick, became a Registered Investment Adviser with the U.S. Securities and Exchange Commission.
 2014: Warwick invested the capital of Warwick Partners II LLC in oil and gas and midstream interests in the Eagle Ford Shale of South Texas. That same year, Warwick entered into a joint venture through which it acquired oil and gas mineral and royalty assets for investor ownership on behalf of US & international pension funds.
 2013: Warwick invested the capital of Warwick Partners I LLC in the Permian Basin of Texas, the Mid-Continent Basins of Oklahoma and Arkansas, the Powder River Basin of Wyoming, and the DJ Basin of Colorado.
 2010: Warwick Energy Group, LLC was founded in New York.

Investment Verticals

Natural Resources 
Warwick's natural resources team specializes in acquiring and consolidating subsurface real estate. Warwick’s active discretionary funds, Warwick Partners III and Warwick Partners IV seek to invest in cash flowing oil and gas assets and develop low breakeven cost inventory. Warwick partners with blue-chip operators and has its own operations team to develop its properties. Active investments of note include ownership of:  

 One of the largest private companies in the core of the Mid-continent oil and gas fields in Oklahoma
 Interests in the Eagle Ford Shale oil field (including midstream infrastructure) in Karnes and Live Oak Counties, Texas
 A $450 million acquisition of operated oil and gas assets from Rosewood Resources - an entity owned by the Caroline Rose Hunt Trust Estate - which are adjacent to Warwick’s Karnes and Live Oak interests

Previous divestitures include assets located in the Midland Basin in Texas, the Powder River Basin in Wyoming, the Fayetteville Shale in Arkansas, the Delaware Basin in Texas and the Bakken Shale in North Dakota. Active Warwick funds are focused on investment in low-cost oil basins in Texas, New Mexico and Oklahoma.

Real Estate 
Warwick's real estate platform is focused on executing consolidation strategies in the cores of global cities with the potential for long-term capital appreciation across multiple real estate asset classes. 

The residential platform is headed by Andrew Chrysostomou who formerly led the central London developer, CPC Group. Throughout 2021 and 2022, Warwick has acquired over 20 multifamily buildings across central London in the Mayfair and Belgravia neighborhoods.

Awards and affiliations 
In October 2021, Warwick's CEO, Kate Richard, was named to the Private Equity 2021 Women to Watch List by the Wall Street Journal, and was the only private equity founder named in the group. 

In February 2020, Warwick became a signatory of the UN-supported Principles for Responsible Investment.

In October 2018, Warwick's CFO, Brian Blad was named one of Oil & Gas Investor's "Forty Under 40 in Energy"

See also 

 Private equity firm
 Private equity fund
 List of private equity firms
 List of oil exploration and production companies
 List of largest oil and gas companies by revenue
Private equity real estate

References

External links
 

Financial services companies established in 2010
Private equity firms of the United States
 
Oil companies of the United States
Natural gas companies of the United States
Petroleum in Oklahoma
Companies based in Oklahoma City
Energy companies established in 2010
American companies established in 2010